Professionals in the City (commonly known as PNC) is a socializing and networking private organization based out in Washington, DC, with branches in New York City, Los Angeles, Philadelphia, Baltimore, and Boston.

It was founded in 1999 by Michael Karlan, who serves as the incumbent president of the organization. PNC has 200,000 members and hosts more than 1,000 events a year.

History
The organization was established in 1999 in Washington D.C. by Michael Karlan, an American attorney and social entrepreneur. From the beginning, it started as a social club for various events, including singles dinners, museum outings, wine tastings, and paintball trips.

In 2020, during the COVID-19 pandemic and lockdown restrictions in the United States, PNC switched to "virtual speed dating" by using video-conferencing applications such as Zoom.

Organization and activities
PNC consistently organizes community events in Washington DC, Baltimore, Boston, Los Angeles, New York, and Philadelphia. It hosts events showcasing cities' diverse offerings, including their nightlife, arts, cultural and sporting events, and neighborhoods. Many of the events have a matchmaking focus, such as speed dating. The organization also hosts various local dating coaches who give seminars on general principles of dating and attraction, as well as specific topics, such as body language. PNC is also known for organizing dating events for various ethnic, age and LGBT groups.

References

External links 
 Professionals in the City website
 Michael Karlan website

Organizations based in Washington, D.C.
Clubs and societies in the United States